The 1930 Creighton Bluejays football team was an American football team that represented Creighton University as a member of the Missouri Valley Conference (MVC) during the 1930 college football season. In its first season under head coach Arthur R. Stark, the team compiled a 1–7 record (0–4 against MVC opponents) and was outscored by a total of 147 to 40. The team played its home games at Creighton Stadium in Omaha, Nebraska.

Schedule

References

Creighton
Creighton Bluejays football seasons
Creighton Bluejays football